Tom Christopher Garvin  (born 1944) is an Irish political scientist and historian. He is Professor Emeritus of Politics in University College Dublin. He retired from lecturing duties in August 2008. He is an alumnus of the Woodrow Wilson International Center for Scholars in Washington, DC.

Garvin is a graduate of UCD with a Bachelor of Arts degree in history and politics and a Master of Arts degree in politics. His Doctor of Philosophy degree was awarded by the University of Georgia in 1974 for his thesis Political Parties in a Dublin Constituency: A Behavioural Analysis. He was a central figure in establishing the Political Studies Association of Ireland in 1982, and his professional reputation saw him win promotion in UCD, where he became Professor of Politics in 1991. In that capacity, he also served as Head of Department until 2005. His academic career was marked by sabbaticals in the USA (where he spent extended periods in the Woodrow Wilson Center, Washington DC; Colgate University; Mount Holyoke College; the University of Georgia; and, as Burns Professor, Boston College). He was elected as a member of the Royal Irish Academy in 2003.

Garvin's academic output includes 60 articles in journals, chapters in books, and publications of similar type; six books, with a further two forthcoming; two edited volumes; and a range of publications of other kinds. The best-known of his books form a sequence dealing with successive themes in the emergence of modern Ireland: "The evolution of Irish nationalist politics" (1981, 1983); "Nationalist revolutionaries in Ireland 1858-1928" (1987); "1922: the birth of Irish democracy" (1996); and "Preventing the future: why was Ireland so poor for so long" (2004).

Tom Garvin retired on 1 September 2008 after working for 41 years in what is now the UCD School of Politics and International Relations.

Publications
 The Evolution of Irish Nationalist Politics
 Nationalist Revolutionaries in Ireland
 1922: The Birth of Irish Democracy
 Preventing the Future: Why was Ireland So Poor for So Long?
 Judging Lemass
 News from a New Republic: Ireland in the 1950s
 The Books that Define Ireland (with Bryan Fanning)
 The Lives of Daniel Binchy: Irish Scholar, Diplomat, Public Intellectual

References

External links
 
 Garvin's UCD site 

20th-century Irish historians
21st-century Irish historians
Irish political scientists
Living people
University of Georgia alumni
1944 births
Members of the Royal Irish Academy
Academics of University College Dublin